{{DISPLAYTITLE:C7H12}}
The molecular formula C7H12 (molar mass: 96.17 g/mol, exact mass: 96.0939 u) may refer to:

 Cycloheptene
 Heptyne
 Methylenecyclohexane
 Norbornane
 Norcarane
 Vinylcyclopentane

Molecular formulas